is a Japanese writer from Nara Prefecture. He graduated from Kyoto University and his works often have Kyoto as the setting.

In July 2018, it was announced that the first two of Morimi's original works to be published in English will be Penguin Highway and The Night Is Short, Walk On Girl, both published by Yen Press in 2019.

In 2022, Tower of the Sun and Fox Tales were published in English by Yen Press, while The Tatami Galaxy was published by HarperCollins.

Partial bibliography
 (2003)
 (2004)
 (2006)
 (2006)
 (2007)
 (2007)
 (2010)
 (2010)
 (2010) Nihon SF Taisho Award winner.
 (2013)
 (2015)
 (2016)
 (2016) 
 (2020)

References

External links
 J'Lit | Authors : Tomihiko Morimi | Books from Japan 

20th-century Japanese novelists
21st-century Japanese novelists
Writers from Nara Prefecture
Kyoto University alumni
1979 births
Living people